Maurice Lemaître (aka Moïse Maurice Bismuth) (23 April 1926, Paris - 2 July 2018) was a French Lettrist painter (known for his use of Hypergraphy), filmmaker, writer and poet. Lemaître was Isidore Isou's right-hand man for nearly half a century, but began to distancing himself from Lettrism in the 2000s.

Lemaître's paintings, films, photographs and sculptures have been shown in more than twenty personal exhibits in Europe and The United States. The Pompidou Center has acquired some of his paintings, as well as the Musée d'Art Moderne de Paris, where in 1968, a large retrospective of his pictorial and film works took place. Poems by Lemaître were set to music by Michel Faleze and were sung by Marie-Thérèse Richol-Müller.

Publications 
 Le film est déjà commencé ? Séance de cinéma, préface by Isidore Isou, éditions André Bonne, collection Pour un cinéma ailleurs - Encyclopédie du Cinéma, Paris, 1952
 Qu'est-ce que le lettrisme ?, by Maurice Lemaître, Éditions Fischbacher, 1953
 Les Idées politiques du Mouvement lettriste, Éditions Lettristes
 Avant toute  nouvelle interview, Éditions Lettristes 
 Maurice Lemaître, Le Syncinéma, la Ciné-Hypergraphie et le Film Imaginaire, Éditions Paris Expérimental.
 Œuvres Poétiques et Musicales Lettristes, Éditions Lettristes
 50 Ans de Peinture Lettriste, Hypergraphique, Imaginaire, Éditions Le Point Couleur
 Le Mariaje du Don et de la Volga, Collection Acquaviva / Marie-Laure Dagoit Éditions Derrière la salle de bains, Rouen, 2009
 Wanted, Éditions AcquAvivA, Paris, 2009
 Sachez lire Lemaître, Éditions AcquAvivA, Paris, 2009
 Roman Futur, Éditions AcquAvivA, Paris, 2010
 Photos imaginaires médicales (partiellement) néo-nazies, Éditions AcquAvivA, Berlin, 2013
 Galipettes, Éditions AcquAvivA, Berlin, 2014

Filmography 
Director
 1951: Le film est déjà commencé ?
 1975: Six films infinitésimaux et supertemporels (short film)
 1976: Un navet  (short film)
 2001: La Voie des dieux
 2002: Nos stars

Writer
 1951: Le film est déjà commencé ?  by Maurice Lemaître
 1973: La Rose de fer by Jean Rollin

Actor
 1952: Traité de bave et d'éternité d'Isidore Isou : lui-même
 1955: Around the World with Orson Welles épisode Saint-Germain-des-Prés
 1970: La Vampire nue by Jean Rollin
 2001: La Voie des dieux by Maurice Lemaître
 2004: Le Fantôme d'Henri Langlois, documentaire by Jacques Richard
 2007: La Nuit des horloges by Jean Rollin
 2012: Free Radicals: A History of Experimental Film, documentairy by Pip Chodorov

References

External links
 http://www.mauricelemaitre.org/
 https://web.archive.org/web/20081205012117/http://www.lettrisme-international.com/
 Histoire du Lettrisme
 Lemaître on UbuWeb Film
 Lemaître on UbuWeb Sound
 Bismuth-Lemaître Papers. General Collection, Beinecke Rare Book and Manuscript Library, Yale University.

1926 births
2018 deaths
Lettrism
Painters from Paris